Gastón Rodríguez Maeso (born 23 March 1992) is a Uruguayan footballer who plays for Deportivo Cali, on loan from Racing.

Club career
Gastón started playing football at Club 3 de Abril. He later moved to Danubio F.C., before joining Montevideo Wanderers at the age of 15, where his older brother, Maxi Rodríguez, at the time also was playing.

Honours
LDU Quito
Ecuadorian Serie A: 2018

References

1992 births
Living people
Association football forwards
Uruguayan footballers
Uruguayan expatriate footballers
Footballers from Montevideo
Uruguayan Primera División players
Ecuadorian Serie A players
Campeonato Brasileiro Série B players
Montevideo Wanderers F.C. players
Peñarol players
L.D.U. Quito footballers
Racing Club de Avellaneda footballers
Avaí FC players
Deportivo Cali footballers
Expatriate footballers in Ecuador
Expatriate footballers in Argentina
Expatriate footballers in Brazil
Expatriate footballers in Colombia
Uruguayan expatriate sportspeople in Ecuador
Uruguayan expatriate sportspeople in Argentina
Uruguayan expatriate sportspeople in Brazil
Uruguayan expatriate sportspeople in Colombia